Vincent Ng Cheng Hye (born 6 December 1975), also known as Weng Qinghai, is a Singaporean martial artist and former actor. He was prominently a full-time Mediacorp actor from 1997 to 2007. He is best known for acting in Chinese-language television series produced by MediaCorp Channel 8.

Early life 
Ng born into a family of two parents and two sisters.

Career

Acting
Ng joined MediaCorp after reaching the finals of Star Search Singapore in 1997. His first foray into English-language television was in the 2002 Channel 5 series Heartlanders in which he played one of the lead characters. As he was one of few artistes with any formal training in martial arts, he was frequently cast in period and wuxia television series or as characters requiring fight scenes. He left the entertainment industry in November 2007 to concentrate on running Wufang.

Martial arts 
After obtaining an engineering certificate from the Institute of Technical Education (ITE), Ng competed and won the 1995 World Wushu Championships (USA). He continued to juggle martial arts with acting commitments even after signing with MediaCorp full-time. In 2004, he founded Wufang Singapore, a martial arts school. He choreographed and performed the 2006 National Day Parade martial arts display. He published and released his first exercise and fitness book, TEN.

In 2011, Ng was nominated for the Spirit of Enterprise Award in recognition for his work in wushu training.

As of 2019, he is a member of the International Wushu Federation Technical Committee.

Personal life 
Ng married to Mei Ling on 14 July 2017, after having introduced by mutual friends in January 2017. His son, Zander, was born on 30 August 2018.

Filmography

Accolades

References

1975 births
Living people
Singaporean male television actors
Singaporean male martial artists
Wushu practitioners at the 1994 Asian Games
Wushu practitioners at the 1998 Asian Games